The 1981–82 QMJHL season was the 13th season in the history of the Quebec Major Junior Hockey League. The defending Memorial Cup and league champions, the Cornwall Royals left the QMJHL in the offseason, transferring to the Ontario Hockey League.

The league was reduced to nine teams, and dissolved divisions. The remaining teams played a shortened schedule of 64 games each in the regular season. That was balanced by an extended first round playoff schedule. The top eight teams in the regular season participated in a double round-robin of 14 games per team, followed by playdowns.

The Sherbrooke Castors finished first overall in the regular season, winning the Jean Rougeau Trophy, and won their third President's Cup, defeating the Trois-Rivières Draveurs in the finals.

Team changes
 The Cornwall Royals transfer to the Ontario Hockey League.
 The Sorel Éperviers relocate to Granby, Quebec, becoming the Granby Bisons.

Final standings
Note: GP = Games played; W = Wins; L = Losses; T = Ties; Pts = Points; GF = Goals for; GA = Goals against

complete list of standings.

Scoring leaders
Note: GP = Games played; G = Goals; A = Assists; Pts = Points; PIM = Penalties in minutes

 complete scoring statistics

Playoffs
Claude Verret was the leading scorer of the playoffs with 48 points (13 goals, 35 assists).

Round-robin standings
Note: GP = Games played; W = Wins; L = Losses; Pts = Points; GF = Goals for; GA = Goals against 

Semifinals
 Sherbrooke Castors defeated Laval Voisins 4 games to 0.
 Trois-Rivières Draveurs defeated Chicoutimi Saguenéens 4 games to 2.

Finals
 Sherbrooke Castors defeated Trois-Rivières Draveurs 4 games to 0.

All-star teams
First team
 Goaltender - Roberto Romano, Hull Olympiques 
 Left defence - Paul-Andre Boutilier, Sherbrooke Castors
 Right defence - Michel Petit, Sherbrooke Castors
 Left winger - Luc Dufour, Chicoutimi Saguenéens 
 Centreman - John Chabot, Sherbrooke Castors & Claude Verret, Trois-Rivières Draveurs
 Right winger - Pierre Rioux, Shawinigan Cataractes  
 Coach - Jean Lachapelle, Hull Olympiques
Second team
 Goaltender - Mario Gosselin, Shawinigan Cataractes  
 Left defence - Taras Zytynski, Montreal Juniors
 Right defence - Billy Campbell, Montreal Juniors 
 Left winger - Normand Lefrancois, Trois-Rivières Draveurs 
 Centreman - Jacques Sylvestre, Granby Bisons
 Right winger - Sean McKenna, Sherbrooke Castors
 Coach - Pierre Creamer, Montreal Juniors
 List of First/Second/Rookie team all-stars.

Trophies and awards
Team
President's Cup - Playoff Champions, Sherbrooke Castors
Jean Rougeau Trophy - Regular Season Champions, Sherbrooke Castors
Robert Lebel Trophy - Team with best GAA, Montreal Juniors

Player
Michel Brière Memorial Trophy - Most Valuable Player, John Chabot, Sherbrooke Castors
Jean Béliveau Trophy - Top Scorer, Claude Verret, Trois-Rivières Draveurs 
Guy Lafleur Trophy - Playoff MVP, Michel Morissette, Sherbrooke Castors
Jacques Plante Memorial Trophy - Best GAA, Jeff Barratt, Montreal Juniors
Emile Bouchard Trophy - Defenceman of the Year, Paul-Andre Boutilier, Sherbrooke Castors
Mike Bossy Trophy - Best Pro Prospect, Michel Petit, Sherbrooke Castors
Michel Bergeron Trophy - Offensive Rookie of the Year, Sylvain Turgeon, Hull Olympiques Draveurs
Raymond Lagacé Trophy - Defensive Rookie of the Year, Michel Petit, Sherbrooke Castors 
Frank J. Selke Memorial Trophy - Most sportsmanlike player, Claude Verret, Trois-Rivières Draveurs
Marcel Robert Trophy - Best Scholastic Player, Jacques Sylvestre, Granby Bisons

See also
1982 Memorial Cup
1982 NHL Entry Draft
1981–82 OHL season
1981–82 WHL season

References
 Official QMJHL Website
 www.hockeydb.com/

Quebec Major Junior Hockey League seasons
QMJHL